The Rapid River is a  river of Minnesota.  It is a tributary of the Rainy River.

Course
The Rapid River originates in Beltrami Island State Forest.  It flows very near to Upper Red Lake Peatlands National Natural Landmark.  It is a meandering stream flowing through a flat, fairly heavily farmed portion of Lake of the Woods and Koochiching Counties.  It has three main branches, main, east branch and north fork.

The Rapid River water basin is the third smallest on the Minnesota side of the Rainy Lake basin.

See also
List of rivers of Minnesota
List of longest streams of Minnesota

References

External links
Minnesota Watersheds
USGS Hydrologic Unit Map - State of Minnesota (1974)

Rivers of Minnesota
Rivers of Lake of the Woods County, Minnesota
rivers of Koochiching County, Minnesota